Giovanna José Blanco Bazon (born 18 December 1982) is a female judoka from Venezuela, who won the silver medal in the women's heavyweight division (+ 78 kg) at the 2003 Pan American Games in Santo Domingo, Dominican Republic.

Career
Blanco won the silver medal at the 2003 Pan American Games, and represented her native country at the 2004 Summer Olympics in Athens, Greece.

She won the gold medal in the open category, silver in over 78 kg and bronze in the team competition of the 2006 Central American and Caribbean Games.

At the 2012 Summer Olympics she lost to Japanese Mika Sugimoto after only 51 seconds in the second round of the +78 kg category.

References

External links
 
 

1982 births
Living people
Venezuelan female judoka
Judoka at the 2003 Pan American Games
Judoka at the 2004 Summer Olympics
Judoka at the 2011 Pan American Games
Judoka at the 2012 Summer Olympics
Olympic judoka of Venezuela
Pan American Games silver medalists for Venezuela
Pan American Games medalists in judo
Central American and Caribbean Games gold medalists for Venezuela
Central American and Caribbean Games silver medalists for Venezuela
Central American and Caribbean Games bronze medalists for Venezuela
Competitors at the 2006 Central American and Caribbean Games
South American Games gold medalists for Venezuela
South American Games silver medalists for Venezuela
South American Games medalists in judo
Competitors at the 2006 South American Games
Central American and Caribbean Games medalists in judo
Medalists at the 2003 Pan American Games
21st-century Venezuelan women